Barbil Tonto Airstrip  is a public/private airstrip owned by the Government of Odisha and leased to the Jindal Steel and Power located at Barbil in the Kendujhar district of Odisha. The nearest airport/airstrip to this airstrip is Kendujhar Airstrip in Kendujhar, Odisha.

References

Airports in Odisha
Kendujhar district
Airports with year of establishment missing